Branko Grahovac (born 8 July 1983) is a Bosnian-Herzegovinian retired footballer who played as a goalkeeper.

Club career
He started playing in the youth squads of FK Zeta and started playing as a senior in a lower league FK Bratstvo. After only one season he was back to Zeta where he played in the First League of FR Yugoslavia until 2005. Then he moved to Premier League of Bosnia and Herzegovina FK Željezničar. After two seasons there, he signed with Serbian SuperLiga club Borac Čačak. In January 2010 he signed for Romanian club Oțelul Galați.

Personal life
Grahovac is an ethnic Serb (see Serbs in Bosnia and Herzegovina).

Honours

Oțelul Galați
Liga I: 2010–11
Supercupa României: 2011

References

External sources
 
 
 
 Profile at Srbijafudbal
 Profile and stats until 2003 at Dekisa.Tripod

1983 births
Living people
People from Gradiška, Bosnia and Herzegovina
Serbs of Bosnia and Herzegovina
Association football goalkeepers
Bosnia and Herzegovina footballers
NK Bratstvo Gračanica players
FK Zeta players
FK Željezničar Sarajevo players
FK Borac Čačak players
ASC Oțelul Galați players
Kahramanmaraşspor footballers
FC Politehnica Iași (2010) players
FC UTA Arad players
Montenegrin First League players
Premier League of Bosnia and Herzegovina players
Serbian SuperLiga players
Liga I players
Liga II players
TFF First League players
Bosnia and Herzegovina expatriate footballers
Expatriate footballers in Montenegro 
Bosnia and Herzegovina expatriate sportspeople in Montenegro
Expatriate footballers in Serbia
Bosnia and Herzegovina expatriate sportspeople in Serbia
Expatriate footballers in Romania
Bosnia and Herzegovina expatriate sportspeople in Romania
Expatriate footballers in Turkey
Bosnia and Herzegovina expatriate sportspeople in Turkey